In mathematics, the Mellin transform is an integral transform that may be regarded as the multiplicative version of the two-sided Laplace transform. This integral transform is closely connected to the theory of Dirichlet series, and is
often used in number theory, mathematical statistics, and the theory of asymptotic expansions; it is closely related to the Laplace transform and the Fourier transform, and the theory of the gamma function and allied special functions.

The Mellin transform of a function  is

The inverse transform is

The notation implies this is a line integral taken over a vertical line in the complex plane, whose real part c need only satisfy a mild lower bound. Conditions under which this inversion is valid are given in the Mellin inversion theorem.

The transform is named after the Finnish mathematician Hjalmar Mellin, who introduced it in a paper published 1897 in Acta Societatis Scientiarum Fennicæ.

Relationship to other transforms
The two-sided Laplace transform may be defined in terms of the Mellin transform by

and conversely we can get the Mellin transform from the two-sided Laplace transform by

The Mellin transform may be thought of as integrating using a kernel xs with respect to the multiplicative Haar measure,
, which is invariant
under dilation , so that
 the two-sided Laplace transform integrates with respect to the additive Haar measure , which is translation invariant, so that .

We also may define the Fourier transform in terms of the Mellin transform and vice versa; in terms of the Mellin transform and of the two-sided Laplace transform defined above

We may also reverse the process and obtain

The Mellin transform also connects the Newton series or binomial transform together with the Poisson generating function, by means of the Poisson–Mellin–Newton cycle.

The Mellin transform may also be viewed as the Gelfand transform for the convolution algebra of the locally compact abelian group of positive real numbers with multiplication.

Examples

Cahen–Mellin integral
The Mellin transform of the function  is

 

 .

This integral is known as the Cahen–Mellin integral.

Polynomial functions
However, by defining it to be zero on different sections of the real axis, it is possible to take the Mellin transform. For example, if

then

Similarly, if

then

Exponential functions
For , let .  Then

Zeta function
It is possible to use the Mellin transform to produce one of the fundamental formulas for the Riemann zeta function, .  Let .  Then

Thus,

Generalized Gaussian
For , let  (i.e.  is a generalized Gaussian distribution without the scaling factor.)  Then

In particular, setting  recovers the following form of the gamma function

Power series and Dirichlet series

Generally, assuming necessary convergence, we can connect Dirichlet series and related power series

by the formal identity involving Mellin transform:

Fundamental strip

For example, for  the fundamental strip of

is   As seen by this example, the asymptotics of the function as  define the left endpoint of its fundamental strip, and the asymptotics of the function as  define its right endpoint.

Properties

Parseval's theorem and Plancherel's theorem

Let  and  be functions with well-defined
Mellin transforms 
in the fundamental strips .
If the functions  and  
are also square-integrable over the interval , then Parseval's formula holds:

The integration on the right hand side is done along the vertical line  that
lies entirely within the overlap of the (suitable transformed) fundamental strips. 

This gives following alternative form of the theorem:
Let  and  be functions with well-defined
Mellin transforms 
in the fundamental strips .
If the functions  and  
are also square-integrable over the interval , then we have

This gives following theorem:
Let  be a function with well-defined Mellin transform

in the fundamental strip .
If the function 
is also square-integrable over the interval , then Plancherel's theorem holds:

As an isometry on L2 spaces 
In the study of Hilbert spaces, the Mellin transform is often posed in a slightly different way.

In other words, we have set

 

This operator is usually denoted by just plain  and called the "Mellin transform", but  is used here to distinguish from the definition used elsewhere in this article.  The Mellin inversion theorem then shows that  is invertible with inverse

In probability theory
In probability theory, the Mellin transform is an essential tool in studying the distributions of products of random variables. If X is a random variable, and } denotes its positive part, while } is its negative part, then the Mellin transform of X is defined as

 

This transform exists for all s in some complex strip , where .

The Mellin transform  of a random variable X uniquely determines its distribution function FX. The importance of the Mellin transform in probability theory lies in the fact that if X and Y are two independent random variables, then the Mellin transform of their product is equal to the product of the Mellin transforms of X and Y:

Problems with Laplacian in cylindrical coordinate system

In the Laplacian in cylindrical coordinates in a generic dimension (orthogonal coordinates with one angle and one radius, and the remaining lengths) there is always a term:

For example, in 2-D polar coordinates the Laplacian is:

and in 3-D cylindrical coordinates the Laplacian is,

This term can be treated with the Mellin transform, since:

For example, the 2-D Laplace equation in polar coordinates is the PDE in two variables:

and by multiplication:

with a Mellin transform on radius becomes the simple harmonic oscillator:

with general solution:

Now let's impose for example some simple wedge boundary conditions to the original Laplace equation:

these are particularly simple for Mellin transform, becoming:

These conditions imposed to the solution particularize it to:

Now by the convolution theorem for Mellin transform, the solution in the Mellin domain can be inverted:

where the following inverse transform relation was employed:

where .

Applications
The Mellin Transform is widely used in computer science for the analysis of algorithms because of its scale invariance property.  The magnitude of the Mellin Transform of a scaled function is identical to the magnitude of the original function for purely imaginary inputs.  This scale invariance property is analogous to the Fourier Transform's shift invariance property.  The magnitude of a Fourier transform of a time-shifted function is identical to the magnitude of the Fourier transform of the original function.

This property is useful in image recognition.  An image of an object is easily scaled when the object is moved towards or away from the camera.

In quantum mechanics and especially quantum field theory,  Fourier space is enormously useful and used extensively because momentum and position are Fourier transforms of each other (for instance, Feynman diagrams are much more easily computed in momentum space).  In 2011, A. Liam Fitzpatrick, Jared Kaplan, João Penedones, Suvrat Raju, and Balt C. van Rees showed that Mellin space serves an analogous role in the context of the AdS/CFT correspondence.

Examples
 Perron's formula describes the inverse Mellin transform applied to a Dirichlet series.
 The Mellin transform is used in analysis of the prime-counting function and occurs in discussions of the Riemann zeta function.
 Inverse Mellin transforms commonly occur in Riesz means.
 The Mellin transform can be used in audio timescale-pitch modification .

Table of selected Mellin transforms 

See also
Mellin inversion theorem
Perron's formula
Ramanujan's master theorem

Notes

References

 Tables of Integral Transforms at EqWorld: The World of Mathematical Equations.

 Some Applications of the Mellin Transform in Statistics (paper)

External links 
 Philippe Flajolet, Xavier Gourdon, Philippe Dumas, Mellin Transforms and Asymptotics: Harmonic sums.
 Antonio Gonzáles, Marko Riedel Celebrando un clásico, newsgroup es.ciencia.matematicas
 Juan Sacerdoti, Funciones Eulerianas (in Spanish).
 Mellin Transform Methods, Digital Library of Mathematical Functions, 2011-08-29, National Institute of Standards and Technology
 Antonio De Sena and Davide Rocchesso, A FAST MELLIN TRANSFORM WITH APPLICATIONS IN DAFX

Complex analysis
Integral transforms
Laplace transforms